Hello and Goodbye may refer to:
Hello & Goodbye, album by Jump5
 Hello-Goodbye (1970 film), light comedy film.
 Hello and Goodbye (1972 film), Soviet comedy film.
 Hello and Goodbye (play), 1965 play by Athol Fugard.
 [[Hello and Goodbye (L.A. Law)|"Hello and Goodbye" (L.A. Law)]], an episode of L.A. Law
 "Hello and Goodbye", a song in the musical Evita "Hello and Goodbye", a song in the film From Noon till Three  "Hello and Goodbye", a song from The Ataris album End Is Forever''

See also
"Hello, Goodbye", a 1967 song by the Beatles
Goodbye and Hello (disambiguation)
Hello Goodbye (disambiguation)